Oiapoque Airport  is the airport serving Oiapoque, Brazil.

History
Oiapoque Airport, located by the French Guiana border, does not allow for instrument approach. The nearest airport with instrument approach is Cayenne – Félix Eboué Airport at a distance of 66.5 kilometres.

Airlines and destinations
No scheduled flights operate at this airport.

Access

Accidents
4 June 2002: a Marco Zero Táxi Aéreo EMB-721 Sertanejo registration PT-EPH flying from Oiapoque to Macapá International Airport crashed near the Cassiporé River killing all five occupants. The accident was probably caused by poor weather.

See also

 List of airports in Brazil

References

External links

Airports in Amapá
Buildings and structures in Amapá